The 2020 Gautam Buddha Cup was a Twenty20 cricket tournament in Nepal. It was played at the Gautam Buddha International Cricket Stadium, Chitwan, from 12 December to 15 December 2020.

Squads 

Originally, Paras Khadka was the captain of Team Narayani. However, he tested positive for COVID-19 few days before the tournament was about to start. He was withdrawn from the squad and Subash Khakurel was named the captain in his absence.

Source:

Points Table

Matches

League Matches

Final

Statistics

Most runs 

Source: ESPNcricinfo

Most wickets 

Source: ESPNcricinfo

Notes

References

External links 
 Series home at ESPNcricinfo

2020 in Nepalese cricket